= Sonic characteristics of marine species =

Sonic characteristics of marine species - Noise in the ocean is of utmost importance for ocean explorations, oceanographic as well as fisheries studies, sonar operations, etc. The wide range of systems for ocean research demands the need for characterizing the noise sources in the ocean. The ambient noise in the ocean is composite in nature, with components emanating from a variety of noise sources. The problem of identification of noise sources in the ocean is of prime importance because of its diverse practical applications. In view of the importance of the area of identification of noise sources, there is a need and requirement for characterizing the noise sources in the ocean which are of both man made and biological origin.
